Luca Carlevarijs or Carlevaris (20 January 1663 – 12 February 1730) was an Italian painter and engraver working mainly in Venice.  He pioneered the genre of the cityscapes (vedute) of Venice, a genre that was later widely followed by artists such as Canaletto and Francesco Guardi.

Life and work
Carlevarijs was born in Udine.  He was also known as 'Luca Casanobrio' or 'Luca di Ca Zenobri', for his patronage by the latter family.  He worked principally in Venice, where he also died. His daughter, 
Marianna Carlevarijs (1703 - 1750) learned the art of pastel portraiture from Rosalba Carriera.

Carlevarijs visited Rome. Here he was influenced by the Dutch painter Caspar van Wittel (often called Vanvitelli), who was a long-term resident of Rome. Van Wittel was the pioneer of the genre of vedute of Rome.

He painted landscapes, sea-pieces and perspective views. His works included cityscapes with a topological interest as well as imaginary landscapes with ruins.  He completed over a hundred etchings of views in Venice, which give an exact representation of the principal places in that city.

The painters Canaletto, Francesco Guardi and Antonio Visentini are said to have been influenced by his work or even have been his pupils. His paintings and his set of 104 etched views of Venice, which were published in 1703, were the foundation on which Canaletto and Guardi built. Johan Richter collaborated with him. He also collaborated with specialist figure painters who added the staffage into his landscapes or cityscapes.   He worked mostly in Venice.

Gallery

Sources

 Aldo Rizzi, Disegni incisioni e bozzetti del Carlevarijs, Doretti - Udine 1963
 Aldo Rizzi, Luca Carlevarijs, Alfieri - Venice 1967
 Aldo Rizzi, I maestri della pittura veneta del '700, Electa - Milano 1973

References

External links

1663 births
1730 deaths
People from Udine
17th-century Italian painters
Italian male painters
18th-century Italian painters
Italian Baroque painters
Italian vedutisti
Landscape artists
Painters from Venice
17th-century Venetian people
18th-century Venetian people
18th-century Italian male artists